Yucca periculosa   is a plant in the family Asparagaceae with the common name izote (pronounced "ee-SOH-tay"). It is native to the Mexican states of Veracruz, Morelos, Guerrero, Puebla and Oaxaca.

Yucca periculosa is a large, branched, arborescent species up to 6 m tall with creamy white flowers.

References

periculosa
Plants described in 1870
Flora of Veracruz
Flora of Morelos
Flora of Guerrero
Flora of Puebla
Flora of Oaxaca
Taxa named by John Gilbert Baker